Bella Vista is a royal palace of the Nizam during the existence of Hyderabad State, now located in Hyderabad, Telangana, India. It is an Indo-European building standing on a  verdant campus. The building's French architect named it Bella Vista, meaning beautiful sight, since it overlooks the Hussain sagar lake. It is located in the Saifabad suburb and is modeled on the Henley-on-Thames of England.

History
Muslehuddin Mohammed, bar-at-law, became Chief Justice of the High Court of Hyderabad and was given the title Hakim-ud-Dowla. He constructed the palace as his residence in 1905. He lived there from 1905 to 1914 when he fell victim to plague at the age of 57. On his death in 1916, the family decided to sell the palace. The last Nizam purchased it, along with furniture, for Rs 60,000 in 1917.

It was in this palace that the elder son of the Seventh Nizam-Mir Osman Ali Khan who was heir apparent to the throne of Hyderabad - Prince of Berar, Azam Jah lived with his wife, Princess Durru Shehvar.

Some of the famous visitors to the palace include Muhammad Ali Jinnah. It now houses the Administrative Staff College of India.

References

Hyderabad State
Heritage structures in Hyderabad, India
Royal residences in India
Palaces in Hyderabad, India
Palaces of Nizams of Hyderabad